Eugen Holzherr (24 December 1928 – 1990) was a Swiss wrestler. He competed in the men's freestyle light heavyweight at the 1960 Summer Olympics.

References

External links
 

1928 births
1990 deaths
Swiss male sport wrestlers
Olympic wrestlers of Switzerland
Wrestlers at the 1960 Summer Olympics
Sportspeople from the canton of Solothurn